Daimion Collins (born October 28, 2002) is an American college basketball player for the Kentucky Wildcats of the Southeastern Conference (SEC). He was a consensus five-star recruit and one of the top power forwards in the 2021 class.

High school career
Collins played basketball for Atlanta High School in Atlanta, Texas. As a junior, Collins averaged 24.6 points, 13.7 rebounds and 7.7 blocks per game. In his senior season, he averaged 35.2 points, 14.4 rebounds, seven assists and 6.2 blocks per game, earning Texas Gatorade Player of the Year and District 14-3A MVP honors. He was named to the McDonald's All-American Game and Jordan Brand Classic rosters.

Recruiting
Collins was a consensus five-star recruit and one of the top power forwards in the 2021 class. On October 31, 2020, he committed to playing college basketball for Kentucky over offers from Kansas, Oklahoma, Texas and Texas Tech.

Career statistics

College

|-
| style="text-align:left;"| 2021–22
| style="text-align:left;"| Kentucky
| 27 || 1 || 7.5 || .577 || .000 || .857 || 2.0 || .1 || .2 || .7 || 2.9
|- class="sortbottom"
| style="text-align:center;" colspan="2"| Career
|| 27 || 1 || 7.5 || .577 || .000 || .857 || 2.0 || .1 || .2 || .7 || 2.9

References

External links
Kentucky Wildcats bio
USA Basketball bio

2002 births
Living people
American men's basketball players
Basketball players from Texas
Kentucky Wildcats men's basketball players
McDonald's High School All-Americans
People from Atlanta, Texas
Power forwards (basketball)